Hare School is one of the oldest schools in Kolkata, India, teaching grades one to twelve under the West Bengal Board of Secondary Education and the West Bengal Council of Higher Secondary Education. It is a state government-administered boys school and was established by the Scottish watch-maker, David Hare. The establishment date is not agreed upon, but the official year of establishment is 1818. Thus the school is declared as the oldest western type school in Asia. The school is situated opposite the Presidency University, and is also adjacent to the University of Calcutta and Hindu School. The combined campuses of the Hare School and Presidency College is one of the largest in Kolkata.

History

David Hare established  the school in 1818, opposite Hindu College, in the heart of College Street after establishing the Calcutta School David Hare Book Society and the Hindu College, Kolkata (now Presidency College) in 1817 and the Calcutta School Society in 1818. The school started with the name "Arpuli Pathshala" and later as Colootala Branch School, finally it was renamed Hare School in 1867.

Notable alumni
 Ashrafuddin Ahmad Chowdhury, former general secretary of Congress Party
 Dakshinaranjan Mukherjee, social reformer
 Krishna Mohan Banerjee - educationist, linguist and Christian Missionary.
 Rajnarayan Basu - writer, intellectual, and social reformer.
 Girish Chandra Ghosh, playwright, theatre director and thespian 
 Jagdish Chandra Bose - scientist. His work includes crescograph to prove life in trees, First proof of radio waves.
 Akshay Kumar Baral - poet.
 Dibyendu Barua- chess grandmaster.
 Pramathesh Barua - actor and director.
 Brajendranath De, I.C.S., - civilian and historian.
 Guru Dutt, actor, director.
 Romesh Chunder Dutt - civil servant, economist, historian, poet, translator of Vedas.
 Ramtanu Lahiri - researcher on Bengali language, member of the Young Bengal group.
 Dinabandhu Mitra - Bengali writer of British India, works include Neel Darpan.
 Prafulla Chandra Roy - Scientist/chemist: worked on various mercury compounds & founder of Bengal Chemical.
 Nagendra Prasad Sarbadikari - father of Indian football.
 Peary Charan Sarkar - social reformer and writer.
 Radhanath Sikdar - mathematician, first person to calculate the height of Mount Everest.
 Meghnad Saha - inventor of the theory of thermal ionization.
 Ziaur Rahman - Bir Uttom, freedom fighter, and President of Bangladesh 1977–1981.
 Digambar Mitra - First Bengali Sheriff of Kolkata
 Mahendralal Sarkar - Doctor, social reformer, founder of Indian Association for the Cultivation of Science
 Romesh Chandra Mitra- Judge, Calcutta High Court
 Protap Chunder Mozoomdar- leader of  Brahmo Samaj
 Kalikrishna Mitra - Social reformer and educator
 Swami Saradananda - (Saratchandra Chakrabarty) Direct disciple of Sri Ramakrishna - Author of Sri Ramkrishna Lilaprsanga
Swami Vijnanananda - (Hariprasanna Chattopadhyaya) Direct disciple of Sri Ramakrishna 
Mahendranath Gupta - (Author of Sri Sri Ramkrishna Kathamrita)

References

Boys' schools in India
Schools in Colonial India
Primary schools in West Bengal
High schools and secondary schools in West Bengal
Schools in Kolkata
Educational institutions established in 1818
1818 establishments in India